A protoiereus (from , "first priest", Modern Greek: πρωθιερέας) or protopriest in the Eastern Orthodox Church is a priest usually coordinating the activity of other subordinate priests in a bigger church. The title is roughly equivalent with the title of protopope or archpriest.

References

Eastern Orthodox clergy
Ecclesiastical titles
Eastern Christian ecclesiastical offices